The Turkish Van is a semi-long-haired, standardised breed of domestic cat, which was developed in the United Kingdom from a selection of cats obtained from various cities of modern Turkey, especially southeast Turkey. The breed is rare, is one of the larger breeds, and is distinguished by the Van pattern (named after the breed), where the colour is restricted to the head and the tail, and the rest of the cat is white; this is due to the expression of the piebald white spotting gene, a type of partial leucism. A Turkish Van may have blue or amber eyes, or be odd-eyed (having one eye of each colour).

The breed was first recognised as such by a breeder/fancier organisation, the UK-based Governing Council of the Cat Fancy (GCCF), in 1969, under the name Turkish cat. It was later renamed Turkish Van to better distinguish it from the Turkish Angora breed.  The Turkish Van has been claimed to be descended from (and is often confused with) the landrace of usually all-white Van cats, mostly found near Lake Van, though one of the two original breeders' own writings indicate clearly that none of the breed's foundation cats came from the Van area.

Breed standards
Breed standards allow for one or more body spots as long as there is no more than 20% colour and the cat does not give the appearance of a bicolour. A few random spots are acceptable, but they should not detract from the pattern. The rest of the cat is white. Although red tabby and white is the classic van colour, the colour on a Van's head and tail can be one of the following: red, cream, black, blue, red tabby, cream tabby, brown tabby, blue tabby, tortoiseshell, dilute tortoiseshell (also known as blue-cream), brown-patched tabby, blue-patched tabby, and any other colour not showing evidence of crossbreeding with the point-coloured breeds (Siamese, Himalayan, etc.). Not all registries recognise all of these colour variations.

While a few registries recognise all-white specimens as Turkish Vans, most do not. The US-based Cat Fanciers' Association (CFA, the world's largest registry of pedigreed cats) and Fédération Internationale Féline (FIFe, the largest international cat fancier organisation) recognise only Van-patterned specimens, as they define the breed by both its type and pattern. The Germany-based but international World Cat Federation (WCF) considers the all-white specimens a separate breed, which it calls the Turkish , a name that is easily confused with the landrace Van cat, which is called  (two words) in Turkish. In other registries, the all-white cats are not considered show quality and are therefore actively bred against. They are prone to deafness; this is a common defect with many all-white animals.

Varieties

History

The Van cat landrace

The Van cat, a landrace or "natural breed" that may be part of the Turkish Van breed's ancestry, has lived in the Lake Van region (and the areas bordering it in the Armenian highlands) for centuries, hence its name. It is uncertain when these cats made this region their home, but ornaments, drawings, carvings, and jewelry, from at least 5000 years ago, have been found during archaeological digs around the city of Van and its surrounding regions, all bearing the likeness of a semi-longhaired cat with a ring around its tail, much like the Van cat.

The length of time it has spent in the region might also be determined by how well it has adapted to the seasonal climates of the Eastern Turkey area, where Lake Van is located. Remote, mountainous, and rugged, it sits more than 5,600 feet above sea level, with long, frigid winters, and comparatively hot summers.

The Van cat has physically adapted by growing its hair in thick and full for the winter, and then shedding its semi-long hair for the summer, appearing as a short-haired cat. Presumably, it adapted this trait so that it could swim to cool off.

It is believed the Van came to Europe between 1095 and 1272 A.D. Originally brought by soldiers returning from the Crusades, it was transported throughout the Eastern continents by invaders, traders, and explorers. Over the years, the Van cats have been called by a variety of names, including Eastern Cat, Turkish, Ringtail Cat, and Russian Longhair.

It is still possible to import a Van cat from its homeland, but imports are rare. The Van cat has long been considered a national treasure, and is relatively rare in population.

The Turkish Van standardised breed
In 1955, two British photographers, Laura Lushington and Sonia Halliday, while on assignment in Turkey for the Turkish Ministry of Tourism, were given two unrelated cats in Turkey, which Lushington took home with her and allowed to mate. When the offspring came out identical to their parents – chalk white with dark tail and head markings – she set to establishing a standardised breed, originally named Turkish cat, later Turkish Van, and having it recognised by the British cat fancy organisations. Lushington returned to Turkey to find another pair, with the goal of breeding to the standard "three clear generations".

According to Lushington, her original imported cats were: Van Iskenderun Guzelli (female), a cat that came from Hatay Province, Iskenderun, and Stambul Byzantium (male), a cat given by a hotel manager in Istanbul, both in 1955. Two later additions to the gene pool were Antalya Anatolia (female), from the city of Antalya, and Burdur (male), from Burdur city, both in 1959. Lushington did not see Van city before 1963, and only stayed there "for two days and two nights". It is unclear why the name "Turkish Van" was chosen, or why one of the original 1955 kittens was named "Van Iskenderun Guzelli", given their provenance. Of the founding 1955 pair, Lushington wrote, in 1977:

It is unclear whether Lushington was intending to imply that the Hatay and Istanbul kittens had originally come from the Lake Van region, or was simply referring to the Turkish Van foundation stock as "Van kittens" for short. Neither city is near Van Province, and there is no evidence that specimens of the Van cat landrace were ever among the foundation stock.

The Turkish Van was given full pedigree status in 1969 by the Governing Council of the Cat Fancy (GCCF). Called simply the Turkish cat at this point, the name was changed in 1979 in the UK (1985 in the US) to Turkish Van to better distance the breed from the Turkish Angora cat (originally called simply Angora, an old spelling of Ankara).

The Turkish Van began to be imported into America in the 1970s. Beginning in 1983, two Florida breeders, Barbara and Jack Reark, worked to popularise this breed, and in 1985, The International Cat Association (TICA) granted the Turkish Van championship status. In 1988, the Cat Fanciers' Association (CFA) accepted the breed for registration in the miscellaneous class. The CFA later bestowed provisional status to the Van in 1993, and championship status in 1994. In that first year, four Turkish Vans attained the grand title.

Physical characteristics

The Turkish Van is a large, muscular cat with a moderately long body and tail. It has strong, broad shoulders and a short neck; the jock of the cat world. The body of a Van should neither be stocky, or thin. It should call to mind the body build of an athlete, and indeed, it is one of the largest cats. They take from 3 to 5 years to reach their full maturity and when they do males range in weight from 10 - 20 pounds with females ranging from 7 - 12 pounds.

The coat on a Turkish Van is considered semi-long-haired. While many cats have three distinct hair types in their coat – guard hair, awn hair, and down hair – the Turkish Van has no evident undercoat, only one coat. This makes their coat feel like cashmere or rabbit fur. The lack of an undercoat gives a sleek appearance. The coat is uncommonly water repellent, which makes bathing these cats a challenge, though the coat dries quickly. The breed actually has two lengths of hair, determined by season. In the winter, the hair is thick and long. In the summer, the hair sheds to leave a shorter, lighter coat.  The coat begins short at birth and grows in gradually over a period of three to five years, so that the kittens may be short-haired in appearance, with thin tails, but as they mature, the fur on the chest will fill out, and the tail will thicken into a full brush tail. The tail does not shed hair or change according to the season, but remains long and full. The ears remain feathered with fur, so that even with its summer coat, the Van looks soft and fluffy.

The Turkish Van is one of the larger cat breeds. Ideal type should feature broad shoulders with a body that is "top-heavy", that is, a cat with its center of gravity forward. The cat is moderately long, and its back legs are slightly longer than its front legs, but neither the cat itself nor its legs are so long as to be disproportionate. They have large paws and rippling hard muscle structure which allows them to be very strong jumpers. Vans can easily hit the top of a refrigerator from a cold start on the floor. They are slow to mature and this process can take 3 years, possibly longer.

A Turkish Van may have blue eyes, amber eyes, or be odd-eyed (having one eye of each colour, a condition known as heterochromia iridis).  

The breed typically has very large ears when it is a kitten, growing into its ears over time. The nose is straight and Asiatic, considered long for a semi-longhair, and with its high cheek bones, and startlingly bright eyes, it gives off quite an exotic appearance.

Behavior

The TICA standard notes several characteristics, including their high intelligence, energy and playfulness – also making them somewhat mischievous. Muscular and highly driven, they like to climb and perch high up, to study their environment, and they get around their domain with impressive athleticism. They make quite successful hunters as a consequence. Their drive makes them easily trainable with positive reinforcement - to play fetch, do tricks or walk on a leash. Although there may be efforts to move the breed towards greater sociability. a 2021 study in Finland did find that the Turkish Vans in their research showed higher than average tendencies towards fearfulness, aggression towards humans, as well as a lower stress tolerance (notable excessive grooming and litter-box problems), and lower sociability to humans and cats.

Curious, Turkish Vans want to be with their owner participating in whatever is happening, and so they may follow a person from room to room. While Turkish vans are affectionate to their family members, these are not normally lap cats. They may lie next to their owners and will happily allow themselves to be petted, but this is not a breed that tolerates being picked up and often wants to be  their owner, not  their owner.

Turkish Vans do well in a single-pet household and don't seem to suffer much from separation anxiety. When put in a home with other cats, they much prefer being around other Turkish Vans. Dogs can be no problem as long as they are introduced properly and patiently.

When it comes to families, Turkish Vans are happy to play with children, but care must be taken to make sure small ones are reminded that the breed may not enjoy being held, and may strike out if forced into such a situation. The native Van cats of Turkey have been nicknamed the "swimming cats", due to an unusual fascination with water. Despite the modern Turkish Van breed consisting almost entirely of pedigreed, indoor-only cats with no access to large bodies of water, and despite dubious connections between them and the cats of the Lake Van area, some feel that the Turkish Van has a notable affinity for water; for example, instead of swimming in a lake, they may stir their water bowls or play with water in the toilet, and some may even follow their owners into water. However, the idea that the breed likes water more than other cats may be mistaken according to some pet writers.

Genetics
The Turkish Van is largely free of genetic issues and breed-specific health defects. Unlike the Turkish Angora, the Turkish Van doesn't have issues with deafness.

Additionally, due to the Turkish Van's larger size, spay or neutering procedures are sometimes delayed to around 1 year of age, as an early adjustment to their hormone levels can affect how their bones and muscles grow.

The piebald spotting gene (partial leucism) appears in other different species (like the horse and the ball python). It also shows up in other breeds of cat, since the Van pattern is merely an extreme expression of the gene.

The breed's variability of eye colour is genetically caused by the white spotting factor, which is a characteristic of this breed. The white spotting factor is the variable expression of the piebald gene that varies from the minimal degree (1), as in the blue-eyed cats with white tip on the tail to the maximal degree (8–9) that results in a Van-patterned cat, when coloured marks occupy at most 20% of the white background, but the white background in the breed covers about 80% of the body. Breeding two cats together with the same level of white spotting will produce cats with a similar degree of spotting.

Van-patterned Turkish Vans are not prone to deafness, because their phenotype is associated with the Van pattern (Sv) semi-dominant gene. Solid-white Turkish Angoras carry the epistatic (masking) white colour (W) dominant gene associated with white fur, blue eyes, and often deafness. All-white cats of Turkish Van stock may share this gene. All three types of cat may exhibit eye colours that are amber, blue or odd. Deafness is principally associated with white cats having two blue eyes.

See also

 Cat coat genetics

References

External links

 Turkish Van Breed Profile
 Turkish Van Breed Article
 Turkish Van discussion group

Cat breeds originating in Turkey
Natural cat breeds
Cat breeds